Dengfeng (postal: Tengfeng) is a county-level city of Henan Province, South Central China, it is under the administration of the prefecture-level city of Zhengzhou. 

It occupies the southwestern corner of Zhengzhou and is its westernmost county-level division.

Dengfeng is located at the foot of the Mount Song, one of the most sacred mountains in China.  The city is one of the most renowned spiritual centers of China, and is home to various religious institutions and famous temples such as the Taoist Zhongyue Temple, the Buddhist Shaolin Temple (a renowned center for martial arts), as well as the Confucian Songyang Academy and the Gaocheng Observatory, hence its poetic expression derived from Chinese literature as the spiritual "center of heaven and earth". Parts of the city were inscribed on the UNESCO World Heritage List in 2010.

History 
The first Xia Dynasty capital, Yangcheng, was built west of Gaocheng Township on the Yin River under the sacred Mount Song.

The famous Shaolin Monastery, traditionally considered the origin of Zen, is located in Dengfeng where they teach adults as well as children martial arts. It is also a famous tourist attraction.

Administrative divisions
As of 2012, the city is divided to 3 subdistricts, 8 towns and 5 townships.
Subdistricts

Towns

Townships

UNESCO World Heritage Site 

In 2010, UNESCO inscribed several of the most renowned sites of Dengfeng onto its World Heritage List under the title "Historic Monuments of Dengfeng in 'The Center of Heaven and Earth'."  The World Heritage Site includes several historic gates, temples (including the renowned Shaolin Temple), a Confucian academy and the Gaocheng Observatory:
Taishi Que Gates: Gates built in front of what would become the Zhongyue Temple in 118 AD, with carved reliefs of animals, trees, and spirits. 
Zhongyue Temple: A Taoist temple constructed in the 5th century, during Kou Qianzhi's reforms. Includes Juni Hall, a large hall for sacrificing to the gods, two stone statues built in 118 AD that are the oldest surviving stone statues in China. 
Shaoshi Que Gates: Han Dynasty gates (dating to 123 AD), with pictures of horses galloping, a circus, and cuju, and ancient football game.
Qimu Que Gates: A pair of gates built in 123 AD, with images that depict scenes of cockfights, floods, and visitation by the Roman Empire
Songyue Temple Pagoda: Built between 508 and 511, it had very innovative architecture and became a template for many future pagodas.
Shaolin Monastery and its Pagoda Forest: A complex of temples and over 240 pagodas, built over 1300 years starting in the 5th century. A major sacred site for Buddhism.
Huishan Temple: A wooden temple built in the 12th century on the site of the astronomer Yi Xing's residence.
Songyang Academy: Created in the Tang Dynasty, it was considered one of the four greatest academies of classical learning in China. Contributed to the dissemination of Confucianism across China.
Gaocheng Astronomical Observatory: an observatory built in the 13th century to accurately measure the world and create precise calendars.

Other notable sites in Dengfeng include the Fawang Temple, a Buddhist temple built in the Tang Dynasty.

Climate

Transportation 
China National Highway 207
Dengfeng Tourist Railway

Gallery

See also
 Yangcheng (historical city)

References

External links 

 
 Official website Unesco

 
Zhengzhou
World Heritage Sites in China
County-level divisions of Henan
Cities in Henan